Lake Mamacocha (Quechua mama mother / madam, qucha lake) may refer to:
 Lake Mamacocha (Cajamarca), a lake in the Cajamarca Province, Cajamarca Region, Peru
 Lake Mamacocha (Celendín), a lake in the Celendín Province, Cajamarca Region, Peru
 Lake Mamacocha (Huánuco), a lake in the Huánuco Region, Peru